Pedraja de San Esteban is a village in Soria, Spain. It is part of the municipality of San Esteban de Gormaz. The village had 38 inhabitants in 2000.

References

Towns in Spain
Populated places in the Province of Soria